Riddick Bowe vs. Jesse Ferguson, billed as "The Heavyweight Debate", was a professional boxing match contested on May 22, 1993, for the WBA and Lineal Heavyweight championships. The fight took place in RFK Stadium in Washington, DC, was Bowe's second defense of the title he had won from Evander Holyfield in November 1992, and was the main event of a card that included a fight between Roy Jones Jr. and Bernard Hopkins for the vacant IBF middleweight championship, which Jones won.

Background
Since winning what was then the undisputed world heavyweight championship from Evander Holyfield in November 1992, Bowe had made one title defense. That came in February 1993 in a fight against former champion Michael Dokes, whom he knocked out in the first round to retain the WBA, IBF, and lineal championships he still held (he was forced to relinquish the WBC championship after refusing to defend against their number one contender, Lennox Lewis).

Ferguson, meanwhile, had largely been a journeyman fighter over the course of his career. His resume featured bouts against a series of former and future champions, but he had never once fought for a world title and had been defeated nine times when he entered a bout with 1988 Olympic gold medalist and rising contender Ray Mercer on the same night Bowe fought Dokes. Despite being a significant underdog, Ferguson outboxed Mercer and won a decision victory.  

Bowe, who had been seeking a fight with Mercer, instead chose to make his next defense against Ferguson. However, the IBF did not have Ferguson in its contender rankings and refused to allow Bowe to defend their title against him; therefore, when the bout was signed, only the WBA and lineal championships were placed at stake.  Despite his limited success and his status as a 40-1 underdog, Ferguson remained confident that he could defeat Bowe, vowing to get the victory by knockout. Bowe responded to Ferguson's claims by calling him a "knucklehead" while also threatening to "punish" his competitor.

The Fight
Much like in his previous fight, Bowe was able to dominate the entire duration of the fight. Bowe was the aggressor from the opening bell, constantly having Ferguson on the defensive throughout the first round by effectively using his left jab. With less than 30 second left in the round, a left hook from Bowe sent Ferguson back into the ropes which led to Bowe landing another left hook 10 seconds later that dropped Ferguson to the canvas. Ferguson barely was able to answer the referee's 10 count, just managing to get up at the count of nine as the round ended. Only seconds into round 2, Bowe was able to land an 8-punch combination that again sent Ferguson to the mat. This time Ferguson was unable to get up and Bowe was announced the winner by knockout.

Aftermath
After Bowe's two successful title defenses over marginal competition, the much anticipated Bowe–Holyfield rematch was announced to take place on November 6, 1993. Like the previous fight, the two fighters again went the full 12 rounds, this time though, it was Holyfield who would earn the victory, becoming the only man to defeat Bowe in his professional career.

Undercard
Confirmed bouts:

References

World Boxing Association heavyweight championship matches
1993 in boxing
Boxing in Washington, D.C.
Ferguson
Jones Jr. I
Hopkins I
1993 in sports in Washington, D.C.
1993 in American sports